The P60 is a statement issued to taxpayers in the United Kingdom.

P60 may also refer to:

Automobiles 
 Simca Aronde P60, a French automobile
 Toyota Starlet (P60), a Japanese subcompact car
 Trabant P 60, an East German car

Aviation
 Pottier P.60 Minacro, a French homebuilt biplane
 Curtiss P-60, an American prototype fighter aircraft
 Gotha Go P.60, a German jet-powered flying wing fighter proposal
 Hexadyne P60, an aircraft engine

Vessels
 , a patrol boat of the Mexican Navy
 , a patrol vessel of the Royal Bahamas Defence Force

Other uses 
 Hop (protein)
 Papyrus 60, a biblical manuscript
 P60, a state road in Latvia